Acoris may refer to:
Akoris, Egypt, an ancient town in Egypt
Hakor, a pharaoh of ancient Egypt